Minakov or Minakova (feminine) is a Russian surname. It may refer to:

Andrey Minakov (born 2002), Russian swimmer
Boris Minakov (1928–2021), Soviet diplomat
Mikhail Minakov (born 1971), Russian philosopher, political scholar and historian
Vasily Minakov (1921–2016), Soviet naval pilot and Hero of the Soviet Union 
Vitaly Minakov (born 1985),  Russian mixed martial artist, sambist and judoka

Russian-language surnames